Johan Van Barel (Bornem, 3 October 1964) is a Belgian composer, photographer, digital artist and multimedia engineer.

Van Barel writes music for film, television and game projects. His scores breathe the grandeur of the romantic and often bombastic Dimitri Tiomkin themes blended together with the bold and dark atmospheric music of Bernard Herrmann. 

Johan Van Barel was born in 1964. From childhood, he was fascinated by everything related to images and sound. He became passionately interested in both the artistic and technical aspects of music and multimedia in general. During his engineering education, he studied applied arts and photography at the art schools of Temse and Sint-Niklaas.

His multidisciplinary approach feeds his interest in both the compositional and audio-technical aspects of music creation and production. In his works, he combines contemporary elements, like loops and samples, with classical note for note musical composition. Just being busy with images and sound is his driving force as multimedia artist.

Music for film 
 Götepeték by Kisantal Tibor 
 Van Beeld Tot Boek by Walter Dierick with ao. Marijke Meersman, Lies Martens
 Worst Case Scenario III by Marc André (aka Bob Page)
 Stirling Movie van Perry Kroll 
 Repent by Lewis Chen 
 Lost Or Found by Nitin Bal Chauhan 
 The Banana Road by Perry Kroll
 Pirates Of The Drachtstervaart by Jürgen Visser
 Neverwinter Nights (Elegia Eternum) by Uraj Studios 
 Kun Vuosi Jäi Vajaaksi by Jari Koljonen 
 Fletcher The Alien Catcher by Perry Kroll
 Assassins Of The Night by Arid Productions

Coproductions with other composers and artists 
 Pretty Dark Album - 2006 (Dirk Blanchart) orchestral arrangements for Pre-Millennium Friend, Gates Of Heaven, Small Airplanes
 Evo Devo - Tribal Brass (The Terms) orchestral remix
 Stem Voor Mij (Fritz Van Den Heuvel) brass band arrangement 
 Universe (David Floodstrand) Orchestral arrangement
 Spanjaard (Jean Sevriens) audio-mastering
 Tanghetto (Jean Sevriens) audio-mastering

External links 
 
 Muziekcentrum Vlaanderen website
 Photography
 Digital art
 Musical compositions

1964 births
Living people
Belgian film score composers
Male film score composers
People from Bornem